Clyde is a city in Callahan County, Texas, United States. The population was 3,713 at the 2010 census, up from 3,345 at the 2000 census. It is part of the Abilene metropolitan statistical area.

Geography

Clyde is located in northwestern Callahan County at  (32.4044, –99.4982). Interstate 20 passes through the northern side of the city, leading east  to Baird, the county seat, and west  to Abilene.

History

The first settlers came to Clyde around 1876. Mr. Shephard built a log cabin, the first residence, around this time. Many others soon followed. Among the first settlers were people such as R. J. Estes who came all the way from Fort Worth. When he first came, he didn't plan on staying. Mrs. Estes and he had stopped only to rest, but soon decided to stay. In their quick decision to stay, they simply left their belongings under a tree while they traveled to get the rest of their belongings for their new home. All their belongings were still as they had left them when they returned a few months later.

The railroad was prominent in Clyde. It started with only a boxcar, then later a station was added. Along with the railroad came more settlers, homes, and work. Soon a school was needed.

The actual origin of the name "Clyde" is not known. Many believe it was named after a crew foreman. The man worked for the Texas and Pacific Railway Company. The company had a tent for the employees to get supplies. They would say, "Let's go up to Clyde's," not talking about the town, only the supply tent. Soon the railroad company would call their boxcar location "Clyde".

The first post office soon followed. The first postmaster, Jesse L. Miller, was appointed June 27, 1881.

Demographics

2020 census

As of the 2020 United States census, there were 3,811 people, 1,255 households, and 904 families residing in the city.

2000 census
As of the census of 2000, there were 3,345 people, 1,292 households, and 989 families residing in the city. The population density was 1,401.0 people per square mile (540.4/km2). There were 1,410 housing units at an average density of 590.6 per square mile (227.8/km2). The racial makeup of the city was 96.29% White, 0.36% African American, 0.39% Native American, 0.18% Asian, 0.12% Pacific Islander, 1.58% from other races, and 1.08% from two or more races. Hispanic or Latino of any race were 4.04% of the population.

There were 1,292 households, out of which 36.5% had children under the age of 18 living with them, 60.2% were married couples living together, 13.9% had a female householder with no husband present, and 23.4% were non-families. 22.0% of all households were made up of individuals, and 12.5% had someone living alone who was 65 years of age or older. The average household size was 2.56 and the average family size was 2.96.

In the city, the population was spread out, with 28.7% under the age of 18, 6.8% from 18 to 24, 25.0% from 25 to 44, 21.8% from 45 to 64, and 17.7% who were 65 years of age or older. The median age was 37 years. For every 100 females, there were 86.6 males. For every 100 females age 18 and over, there were 82.5 males.

The median income for a household in the city was $33,085, and the median income for a family was $37,257. Males had a median income of $27,426 versus $22,188 for females. The per capita income for the city was $15,699. About 5.3% of families and 8.0% of the population were below the poverty line, including 8.6% of those under age 18 and 6.3% of those age 65 or over.

Education
The City of Clyde is served by the Clyde Consolidated Independent School District and home to the Clyde High School Bulldogs. In 2008, the football team won the first district championship in over 50 years. In 2017, the marching band advanced to the state UIL marching contest finishing 20th place, and in 2019 once again made it to state, finishing in 16th place.

References

External links
 

Cities in Texas
Cities in Callahan County, Texas
Cities in the Abilene metropolitan area